Dystrichothorax placidus is a species of ground beetle in the subfamily Psydrinae. It was described by Lea in 1908.

References

placidus
Beetles described in 1908